Rāmopākhyāna is a section of the Indian epic Mahabharata, telling the story of Rama and Sita, a tale best known from the other great Sanskrit epic, the Ramayana.

Content 
The story comprises 704 verses spread across book 3 (the Vana Parva, also known as the Aranyaka-parva or Aranya-parva). In the standard numbering of the chapters of book 3, it comprises chapters 257–75.

At the beginning of the Ramopakhyana section of the Mahabharata, the character Yudhishthira has just suffered the abduction of his wife and been exiled to the forest. Asking whether there has ever been someone more unfortunate than himself, he is told the comparable story of Rama and Sita as a moralising tale, counselling him against despair. The account of Rama and Sita in the Rāmopākhyāna is noted for treating Rāma as a human rather than a divine hero; in not mentioning Sita's banishment following her return to Ayodhya; and in not mentioning how she disappears into the earth thereafter.

Origins 
According to W. J. Johnson, 'most current scholarship believes it to have been derived from a memorized version of the story drawn from the northern recension of the Rāmāyaṇa prior to the completion of that text as we now have it'.

Editions and translations 

 Kisari Mohan Ganguli (trans.), The Mahabharata of Krishna-Dwaipayana Vyasa (Calcutta: Bharata, 1883–96). In this widely used translation, the Ramopakhyayana appears at book 3, chapters 275-90.
 Peter Scharf, Ramopakhyana: The Story of Rama in the Mahabharata. An Independent-study Reader in Sanskrit (London: RoutledgeCurzon, 2003), .
 Pendyala Venkata Subrahmanya Sastry worte a critical analysis of Ramopakhyana by Errana entitled Ramopakhyanamu-Tadvimarsanamu (1938) in Telugu language, who is one of the authors of Mahabharata.

References 

Mahabharata
Works based on the Ramayana